

News

January
3 - In the first event of 2007 Anssi Koivuranta and Hannu Manninen clinch a victory in the team sprint held in Ruhpolding. They finished in front of the German and Austrian team.

Nordic combined World Cup

FIS Nordic World Ski Championships

Location: Sapporo, Japan

References